The engines of DR Class 99.23 are metre gauge tank locomotives, that were procured by the Deutsche Reichsbahn (DR) in East Germany from 1954 to 1956. When they entered service they had operating numbers 99 231–99 247. Today they are numbered 99 7231–99 7247.

History 
A total of 17 locomotives were bought by the DR between 1954 and 1956 for the railways of the Harzquerbahn and Brockenbahn, and for the line from Eisfeld to Schönbrunn to replace much of the very old fleet. The first seven units (99 231 to 99 237) were originally equipped with two Krauss-Helmholtz bogies. Due to problems with curve running, the engines in the second series were given Beugniot levers between the first and second coupled axles in addition to the Krauss-Helmholtz bogies. (according to other sources also a Schwartzkopff-Eckhardt II bogie). The locomotives of the first series were subsequently modified with Beugniot levers, some in the early 1960s, others in 1973/74 (on the Harz lines). The thinner wheel flanges of the driving wheels were completely removed later in order to achieve better curve running. Certainly the engines in the second series did not have a rigid wheelbase.

The drive was applied to the third coupled axle, the locomotives had Heusinger valve gear with unsprung Müller balanced slide valves and, later, Trofimoff valves.

These Neubaulokomotiven were a fully welded evolutionary development of the standard locomotives (Einheitsloks) of the DRG Class 99.22. In contrast to those, the 99.23-24s had mixer-preheaters and plate frames. However, the latter caused maintenance difficulties from the outset due to cracks and distortion. To date five locomotives (the present-day 99 7232, 7240, 7245, 7239, 7236) were equipped from 2004 onwards with a new, redesigned plate frames and new, welded, steam cylinders. More should follow. All the engines still exist and are based in the Harz; some however are no longer working.

The engines were converted to primary oil-firing between 1977 and 1983 and are the most powerful narrow gauge German steam locomotives ever to have been built. They are primarily used on the line up to the Brocken from Wernigerode.

Their operating numbers changed from 99 231 et seq to 99 7231 et seq on the introduction of computerised numbers in 1970 and then again to 99 0231 et seq on conversion to oil-firing. The computer numbers are still valid, because the HSB retains those allocated in the 1970 DR renumbering scheme.

Locomotives 

 99 7231: out of service
 99 7232: working, new frame
 99 7233: out of service
 99 7234: working
 99 7235: working
 99 7236: working, new frame
 99 7237: working
 99 7238: out of service
 99 7239: working, new frame
 99 7240: working, new frame 
 99 7241: working
 99 7242: working
 99 7243: working
 99 7244: out of service
 99 7245: working, new frame
 99 7246: out of service
 99 7247: working

Photo gallery

See also 

 List of East German Deutsche Reichsbahn locomotives and railbuses
 Neubaulok

References 

 Obermayer, Horst J. Taschenbuch Deutsche Schmalspur-Dampflokomotiven, Franckh'sche Verlagshandlung, Stuttgart, 1971, pp. 60–61.
 Vetter, Klaus J. Das große Handbuch deutscher Lokomotiven, Bruckmann, München, 2001, pp 191–192.
 
 Weisbrod, Manfred; Wiegard, Hans; Müller, Hans; Petznick, Wolfgang. Deutsches Lok-Archiv: Dampflokomotiven 4 (Baureihe 99), Transpress, Berlin,, 1995, pp 53–57.

External links 
 Freundeskreis Selketalbahn website 
 HSB website 

99.023
2-10-2T locomotives
99.23-24
Railway locomotives introduced in 1954
Metre gauge steam locomotives
1′E1′ h2t locomotives
LKM locomotives